Tracey Marion Jeniree Nicolaas (born 1987), won the Miss Aruba pageant in 2007 and represented her country in Miss Universe 2008.

References

External links
Miss Aruba
Miss Universe Aruba 2007

1987 births
Living people
Miss Universe 2008 contestants
Aruban beauty pageant winners